Bryan Buckley is an American filmmaker, screenwriter, producer, and two time Academy-Award nominated director. His successful career has led to him being dubbed the “King of the Super Bowl" 

Buckley's directorial debut came with a series of commercials he created for NHL on ESPN, before creating  the “This is SportsCenter” campaign for ESPN in 1999. The work became an part of the ESPN brand, and launched Buckley into the commercial world. Buckley would go on to direct 64 Super Bowl Commercials.

He has directed two feature films and four short films. Of his four shorts, Krug (2004) played at Sundance, Wake Up Caller (2004) played at Tribeca, while ASAD (2013) and SARIA (2019) have been nominated for Best Live Action Short Film at the Academy Awards. His two nominations in the same decade is the first time a director has managed to return to the category in over 30 years.

His first feature film The Bronze (2015), opened the 2015 Sundance Film Festival, while his second, Pirates of Somalia (2017), premiered at the Tribeca film festival.

A 2010 Adweek Readers Poll named Buckley the Commercial Director of the Decade - he was also named one of the 50 best Creative Minds in the last 25 years by Creativity Magazine.

Personal life 
Bryan Buckley was born on September 3, 1963 in Cambridge, Massachusetts. He spent his first years in Sudbury, a suburb of Boston, before moving in 1970 to live on a farm in Madbury, New Hampshire.

His father, a onetime Army reservist, worked as an art director in a small regional ad agency and later became chair of Boston's New England school of Art. His mother worked as a top promotional executive at Jordan Marsh department store. His parents were both activists involved in the anti-war and Civil Rights movements on the 1960s. In 1976, his parents separated and he returned to Massachusetts with his mother.

In his senior year of high school, Buckley was selected to the Short Term Institute at Phillips Andover preparatory school on a full art scholarship. He was then admitted to Syracuse University's design program - he finished his first class in Advertising Design there in 1985, but never enrolled in a film class during his time in college.

In 2017, Buckley married actress Kiana Madani. He has three children.

Early career 
After graduating Syracuse, Buckley began as an entry-level art director at Doyle Dane Bernbach.

In 1988, he co-founded his own agency, Buckley / DeCerchio, with his Chiat/Day co- worker Tom DeCerchio. Their first client was the 4 million dollar Godfather's Pizza account. Buckley and De Cerchio then hired friends and filmmakers who would work cheaply. Within a few months, Buckley and De Cerchio were on the cover of Adweek. In their first year open, their work for Godfather's Pizza was awarded with a Gold Pencil at the One Show, an advertising awards show.

The agency would go on to sign clients such as Yugo cars and Snapple, for whom they created the famous “Made From the Best Stuff on Earth National” tag. In December 1993, Buckley and DeCerchio made the cover of the New York Times Business Section. The next day they announced that a new chapter had begun, and closed the agency.

This Is Sportscenter 
In 1994, Buckley, with his collaborator Frank Todaro, was offered the chance to direct a few unscripted, ultra low-budget promos for ESPN's hockey telecasts. Buckley had never been behind the camera before, and the job was not paid.

Over its 25-year run, the campaign has featured appearances from several sports stars, including Kobe Bryant, Wayne Gretzky, David Ortiz, Lebron James, Mike Tyson, and Michael Phelps. ’’SportsCenter’’ was named the best commercial campaign of the 1990s by The One Club.

Hungry Man Productions 
In 1997, Buckley co-founded Hungry Man Productions along with "This is SportsCenter" creator, Hank Perlman and long-time producer Steve Orent. The company quickly added several directors to its roster, such as Jim Jenkins, David Shane, Bennett Miller and Stacy Wall.

Buckley's first major work came in 1999 with his first Super Bowl spot, a commercial for Monster.com called “When I Grow Up.” In the 30-second spot, kids  answered the question “What do you want to be when you grow up?” with responses such as “I want to be a ‘yes’ man’ and “I want to be forced into early retirement.”

Initially, the ad was considered a disappointment, as viewers gave the commercial low marks in the USA Today Ad Meter, a consumer poll of the best and worst Super Bowl ads that has become an industry standard for measuring public reaction (and therefore success) of a multi-million dollar project.
 
However, the Monster.com ad continued to get airplay over the next few days while conversation around other commercials died down, and the job site ended up crashing due to increased user activity. Monster.com reported an increase of 1 million site visits per month for the rest of 1999.

By 2004, the company won the Cannes Festival's Palme d'Or as the top commercial production company in the world and has finished in the top ten for more than ten consecutive years, the first production company to do so. Hungry Man has offices in New York, Los Angeles, London, Rio and São Paulo, and has a slate of directors including Taika Waititi, Wayne McClammy, and Nanette Burstein.

Commercial Work 
Over the course of his career, Buckley has worked on several campaigns and commercial spots, including “What Happens in Vegas,” Verizon's first ever Spanish language campaign for the Oscars, and FedEx's “Castaway.”

As his work has grown in scale, Buckley has collaborated with celebrities such as Larry David, Jennifer Aniston, Conan O’Brien, Ellen DeGeneres, Leslie Mann, Taylor Swift, and The Rock, who starred in Apple's “The Rock x Siri Dominate the Day” commercial, which racked up over 80 million views.

His work has often garnered publicity, and has at times been described as "anticommercials". His commercial for E*Trade in 2000 featured a mock-amateur commercial. The setting: a disheveled two-car garage. A chimpanzee, wearing an oversize E*Trade T-shirt, is flanked by a pair of men. All face the camera. They clap, out of sync, to a tinny recording of ''La Cucaracha.'' At the end, the chimpanzee folds his hands over his crotch. A tag line appears: ''Well, we just wasted $2 million. What are you doing with your money?’’ In 2018, Adweek would declare it “The Most Subversive Super Bowl Ad Ever.”

In 2011, Buckley directed a series of commercials for New Era apparel. The campaign, titled “Rivalry,” saw actors John Krasinski and Alec Baldwin engaged in ongoing trash talk as fans of their respective teams, the Boston Red Sox and New York Yankees. The spots were inducted into the Permanent Collection of the Museum of Modern Art.

His 2020 Super Bowl spot for Hyundai, titled "Smaht Pahk," was a massive success. It was named on several best of the game lists by Time, Adweek, and Vogue. It was also ranked No. 2 in the USA Today Ad Meter. The spot, which starred John Krasinski, Chris Evans, Rachel Dratch, and David Ortiz featured the Massachusetts natives over-enunciating the distinctive vowels of the classic Boston accent as they talked about Hyundai's new Sonata. In 2022, Buckley directed the Toyota Super Bowl spot with Saatchi & Saatchi.

Awards
In 1999, Buckley won the Best Directing award from the DGA, a cumulative award for several commercials he directed that year, including his Super Bowl monster.com “When I Grow Up” spot, and work for E*trade.

He has been won three Emmy Awards, and has won over 50 Cannes Lions, most recently the top honors at Cannes in 2019, a Grand Prix for his work on March for Our Lives “Generation Lockdown” campaign to raise awareness about gun violence prevention. Buckley also took the Titanium Lion and the top honors, a Grand Clio for his Microsoft “Changing the Game” work showcasing Xbox's new adaptive controller, the first ever system designed to be inclusive of handicapped gamers. The same year, he won 15 gold pencils at the One Show for his work with both the Microsoft and March for our Lives campaigns.

Buckley's two Academy Award nominations for Short Film within the same decade is the first time a director has managed to return to the category in over 30 years.

Narrative Work 
In September 2011, Buckley shot the short film ASAD in South Africa in September 2011 with an all Somali refugee cast. The story, which Buckley also wrote, follows a young Somali boy's tale of how he deals with the decision to fall into a pirate life, or become an fisherman. The film screened at over 50 film festivals worldwide and took top honors at the Tribeca Film Festival, ultimately receiving a nomination for Best Live Action Short Film at the 85th Academy Awards.

Buckley's first feature film, The Bronze, was selected to open the 2015 Sundance Film Festival and made a splash in Park City as the breakout comedy of the festival. The film features a notorious sex scene, called one of the 15 greatest of all time by InStyle and deemed the "wildest sex scene" by Vulture.

In 2017, Buckley wrote and directed the American drama film The Pirates of Somalia. The film stars Evan Peters, Oscar Winner Al Pacino, Melanie Griffith, and Barkhad Abdi. The film, set in 2008, is about rookie Canadian journalist Jay Bahadur's  plan to embed himself among the pirates of Somalia to provide the first close-up look at who these men are, how they live, and the forces that drive them. The film had its world premiere at the Tribeca Film Festival on April 27, 2017. The film was released on December 8, 2017, by Echo Bridge. The Hollywood Reporter called the film “A lively tale bent on deepening our understanding of its sensationalism-ready subject.”

In 2019, Buckley wrote and directed the short film SARIA. The film explores the life of young female orphans at the Virgen de La Asuncion Safe Home in Guatemala, leading up to the fire which claimed 41 of their lives in 2017. The film was received well by critics, and Variety called the film "harrowing, but completely convincing in the way it presents the sexual and psychological abuse they endured... an influential chapter in a story that’s still being written."

Rather than using traditional child actors to play the roles of the orphans, Buckley opted to reach out to orphanages throughout Mexico to participate in the film. Ultimately, he established a partnership with Ministerios De Amor Orphanage in Mexico City. None of the girls had ever acted before they participated in the film. They received extensive training from an acting coach who would come to the orphanage daily.

The production team bypassed the traditional festival circuit and four-walled the film for Academy Consideration just two days after completion, an unproven process that did not allow the traditional press cycle to build buzz around the film. However, the plan succeeded and the film received a nomination for Best Live Action Short Film at the 92nd Academy Awards.

Directing Style 
His early work has been characterized as anarchic and populist. Defined by a “run and gun” style that often challenged the importance of advertising to begin with. "It ain't feel-good advertising," Buckley acknowledges.

Buckley's work has been primarily comedic. New York Times Magazine wrote “Bryan is an interpreter of American fears. He doesn't make commercials; he writes haiku.” He has been celebrated for his casting ability, and in his skill for directing unprofessional actors, whom he often casts for a more raw performance. Bryan's later work has typically involved more prominent celebrity roles, driven by character-driven comedy.

Though his body of work is primarily comedic, Buckley has shifted to a more socially-conscious approach in recent years.His narrative work has been defined by a focus on the oppressed and oppressors, and the need to illuminate otherwise unknown or under-reported injustices.

Activism 
Buckley has been a long-time supporter of activism and philanthropy. In the past, he was worked with organizations like Women's March to create advocacy campaigns at no cost.

In 2019, Buckley directed work for the “Generation Lockdown” campaign on behalf of March for our Lives, an organization dedicated to preventing gun violence in the USA. The commercial was created in support of the S.42 Background Check Expansion Act, and was cited by several members of Congress to advocate for stricter gun control.

After the release of his 2019 short, SARIA, the film was cited by members of Congress in a 2020 letter to the Secretary of State. Congressmen Adriano Espaillat and Vicente Gonzalez stated the film "amplifies global awareness" of the issue, and demanded justice for the victims and an investigation into the whereabouts of the remaining survivors. Buckley has stayed involved with the pursuit of justice within Guatemala, attending a meeting on Capitol Hill between Stef Arreaga, a prominent activist and Congressmen Adriano Espaillat and Vicente Gonzalez Jr.

In 2020, Buckley created a team named Trump Statue Initiative dedicated to mocking Donald Trump and actions taken during his presidency. Buckley noted "Trump is obsessed with statues".

On June 4, 2021, Buckley partnered with ad agency Leor Burnett and two parents of a child killed in the 2018 shooting at Marjory Stoneman Douglas High School to mislead gun rights activists John Lott and David Keene into believing they were to give a dress rehearsal for a 2021 graduation address for a fictitious school called, "the James Madison Academy". The space for the audience was made up of 3,044 empty folding chairs which were meant to represent victims of school shootings. According to BuzzFeedNews, Lott claims he was instructed "...they insisted that I had to have half the talk...be on background checks in particular", while Lott says this was his first commencement address, he went on to assert, "So I said well okay if that's really what you want I can do that but it seemed a little bit weird for a commencement address." In reality, the event was a staged attempt to call attention to school shootings, and not a genuine commencement address dress rehearsal when the parents orchestrating the faux event posted segments of video that was filmed of the "dress rehearsal" to the internet. Will Pregman, an activist associated with a progressive group based in Nevada called Battle Born Progress said of the event, "They agreed to speak to a school without doing, ironically, a background check to find out if this was a valid school or a real event."  The work was covered across numerous media platforms, including Rachel Maddow of MSNBC.

King Of The Super Bowl 
Buckley's work has consistently aired during the Super Bowl, leading to the New York Times deeming him the “King of the Super Bowl” in, Buckley has directed 68 commercials. His work is often rated at the top of every year's Super Bowl Commercial rankings. 

Toyota - Keeping Up With The Joneses (2022)
Verizon - No Thanks, Cable Guy (2022)
BMW - How Zeus Got His Joy Back (2022)
Cheetos - It Wasn't Me (2021)
Verizon - Don't Blame The Lag (2021)
Bud Light - Bud Light Legends (2021)
SodaStream - Water on Mars (2020)
Hyundai - Smaht Pahk (2020)
Colgate - Close Talker (2019)
Microsoft - We All Win (2019)
Febreze - Bleep Don't Stink(2018)
Bud Light - Ghost Dog (2017)
He's a Ten - 4 Years of Hair (2017)
Honda - New Truck to Love (2016)
SodaStream - Sorry, Coke and Pepsi with Scarlett Johansson (2014)
TurboTax - Love Hurts (2014)
GoDaddy - Body Builder, Puppet Master (2014)
Best Buy - Asking Amy (2013)
Tide (brand) - Miracle Stain (2013)
Coca-Cola - Mirage (2013)
CareerBuilder - Business Trip (2012)
Best Buy - Ozzy vs Bieber (2011)
Audi - Release the Hounds (2011)
Mini Cooper - Cram It in the Boot (2011)
Teleflora - Help Me Faith with Faith Hill (2011)
CareerBuilder - Parking Lot (2011)
McDonald's - Proud Papa (2011)
Audi - Green Police (2010)
HomeAway - Hotel Hell Vacation (2010)

Cash4Gold - One Up (2009)
H&R Block - Murray (2009)
Bud Light - Conan O'Brien (2009)
Sprint Nextel - Roadies (2009)
Planters - Perfume (2008)
Bud Light - Endorsement with Jackie Moon (2008)
CareerBuilder - Darts, Promotion Pit, Performance Evaluation (2007)
Chevy - Car Wash (2007)
Bud Light - Save Yourself (2006)
Sprint Nextel - Crime Deterrent, Couch (2006)
Burger King - America's Favorite with The Whopperettes (2006)
CareerBuilder - I Understand, Celebration (2006)
FedEx - Top Ten (2005)
GoDaddy.com - GoDaddy (2005)
MasterCard - Cashier (2005)
CareerBuilder - Titanic, Whoopee Cushion, Monkey's Apology (2005)
Chevy - Soap (2004)
Pepsi - The Osbournes (2003)
FedEx - Desert Island (2003)
H&R Block - Willie (2003)
Visa - Bacon (2002)
E-Trade - Entertainer (2002)
Charles Schwab - HR King (2002)
E-Trade - Security Guard, Romantic Dinner, Monkey II (2001)
FedEx - Blow Up (2001)
E-Trade - Monkey, Basketball, Out the Wazoo, Window (2000)
Monster.com - When I Grow Up (1999)

References

External links

1963 births
American film directors
American screenwriters
Living people
Advertising directors